Julien Brellier (born 10 January 1982, in Échirolles, Isère) is a French footballer. He currently plays amateur football for AC Seyssinet. His former clubs include Hearts and Norwich City.

Playing career

Early career
Brellier started his career at French club Montpellier and was recruited by Italian giants Internazionale in 2000. He made a limited number of appearances with Inter and was loaned out to Lecco and Legnano before joining Venezia, initially under a co-ownership agreement. He played part of the 2004–05 season with Salernitana and was released in June 2005 due to the bankrupt of Venezia.

Heart of Midlothian
Brellier impressed manager George Burley and was signed on a two-year deal by the Edinburgh side in August.

Brellier quickly became a firm favourite with the Hearts fans: his unspectacular, diligent covering role in midfield allowing fellow midfielders Paul Hartley and Rudi Skácel greater attacking freedom, from which they scored a combined total of 30 league goals during the 2005–06 season. By the latter part of that season a giant French flag, with the words "Le Juge" emblazoned across it, became a regular spectacle at Hearts' home stadium Tynecastle, while the crowd took to singing his name to the tune of Verdi's La donna è mobile.

Despite Brellier being one of the most popular players at Tynecastle, it was frequently reported in the media that Hearts' owner Vladimir Romanov did not share the supporters' high opinion of him.

After the signing of Bruno Aguiar, Brellier was used more often as a substitute and, in an April 2006 interview, he suggested he was unhappy with the treatment he had received. However, in June 2006 it was confirmed that Brellier had agreed to extend his stay with Hearts until 2007. He appeared as a substitute as Hearts won the 2006 Scottish Cup Final.

The 2006–07 season continued in a similar vein to the previous year for Brellier, with the Frenchman starting less than half of Hearts' games. His cause was not helped by a controversial sending-off in the Maroons Champions League qualifying round defeat to AEK Athens Following much speculation during the season, in May 2007 it was confirmed that he would leave Hearts, after rejecting a final contract offer.

Post-Hearts Career
On 14 June, Brellier's agent, the brother of former Manchester United star Eric Cantona, confirmed that the player was in talks over a possible move to Rangers. However, he joined Norwich on 3 July, signing a two-year deal.

Brellier was sent off for the first time in his Norwich career on 22 September 2007 in a 2–0 defeat at Wolves. He was unable to establish himself in the first team under new manager Glenn Roeder and the club terminated his contract on 11 January 2008. He subsequently signed for FC Sion. In March 2010, Brellier severed ties with FC Sion and began training with Ligue 1 side Grenoble in order to maintain his fitness as he searched for a new club. In October 2010 Brellier decided to retire from professional football and joined amateur side AC Seyssinet, who play in the 7th tier of French football.

Honours
Heart of Midlothian
 Scottish Cup: 2005–06

References

External links

Appearances at londonhearts.com

1982 births
Living people
People from Échirolles
French footballers
French expatriate footballers
Association football midfielders
Montpellier HSC players
Inter Milan players
U.S. Salernitana 1919 players
A.C. Legnano players
Calcio Lecco 1912 players
Venezia F.C. players
Heart of Midlothian F.C. players
Norwich City F.C. players
FC Sion players
Scottish Premier League players
English Football League players
Swiss Super League players
Serie B players
Expatriate footballers in Scotland
Expatriate footballers in England
Expatriate footballers in Switzerland
Sportspeople from Isère
Footballers from Auvergne-Rhône-Alpes